Haplogroup S1a  is a human Y-DNA haplogroup, defined by SNPs Z41335, Z41336, Z41337, Z41338, Z41339, Z41340, and Z41341.

S1a is found primarily in Melanesia (especially in Papua New Guinea), Micronesia,  Maritime Southeast Asia and among indigenous Australians. 

As of 2017, it includes an unnamed primary subclade referred to by ISOGG as "S1a~" (P405),  (which was previously known as K2b1a). The "~" symbol is ISOGG's way of indicating that an unverified and as-yet unnamed immediate ancestor may exist.

Its secondary subclades include: S1a1 (Z42413), S1a2~ (P79, P307) and S1a3 (P315).

Before 2016, S1a1b (M230, P202, P204) was  known as  Haplogroup S* (and before that as Haplogroup K5). (In 2016, haplogroup S-B254 was "promoted" to S*, from its previous position of S1.)

The "sibling" clades of S1a include: S1b (B275, Z33756, Z33757, Z33758, Z33759), S1c (Z41926, Z41927, Z41928, Z41929, Z41930) and S1d (SK1806).

Phylogeny

Haplogroup S1 (B255) includes the following subclades:
S1a Z41335
 S1a1 Z42413
 S1a1a
 S1a1a1 P60, P304, P308
 S1a1a2
 S1a1b M230, P202, P204 – "demoted" from its previous position as the basal Haplogroup S* (and known before that as Haplogroup K5)
 S1a1b1 M254 (previously known as K2b1a4a) 
 S1a1b1a P57
 S1a1b1b P61
 S1a1b1c  P83
 S1a1b1d SK1891
 S1a2 P79, P307
 S1a3 P315
 S1a3a Z41763
 S1a3b~ P401
S1b~ B275, Z33756, Z33757, Z33758, Z33759
S1c~ Z41926, Z41927, Z41928, Z41929, Z41930
S1d  SK1806
(Based on the 2017 ISOGG tree and subsequent published research.)

Distribution
Basal S1a* appears to be extremely rare or extinct in living males. The primary subclade S-P405* is also relatively rare, but is found at significant levels among various Micronesian populations: 5.6%. It is also found among males on the Indonesian island of Sumba at a rate of 0.2%.

According to ISOGG (2017), S1a1 (Z42413) has been found among the Lebbo' people of Indonesia and S1a1a1 (P60) among indigenous Australians. One study has reported finding S-M230 (S1a1b) in: 52% (16/31) of a sample from the Papua New Guinea (PNG) Highlands; 21% (7/34) of a sample from the Moluccas (Maluku); 16% (5/31) of a sample from the Papua New Guinea coast; 12.5% (2/16) of a sample of Tolai from New Britain; 10% (3/31) of a sample from Nusa Tenggara, and; 2% (2/89) of a sample from the West New Guinea lowlands/coast. One subclade, Haplogroup S1a1b1d1a  (S-M226.1) has been found at low frequencies in the Admiralty Islands and along the coast of mainland PNG.  

The distribution of the other major subclades of S1a according to ISOGG, is as follows:
 S1a2 (P79) – Melanesia and Papua New Guinea, including the Admiralty Islands;
 S1a3 (P315) – indigenous Australians and;
 S1a3b (P401) – Vanuatu.

Footnotes

S1a